Saint Elizabeth of Portugal is a 1630-1635 painting by Francisco de Zurbarán of Queen Saint Elizabeth of Portugal, daughter of Peter III of Aragon and wife of Denis of Portugal. She was known for her generosity, and the painting depicts the queen in the legendary "miracle of the roses", when she was able to turn bread into roses, which she intended to give to the poor, after being asked by her husband about what she was hiding. Since 1818, the painting has been in the Prado Museum in Madrid.

References

External link

Paintings by Francisco de Zurbarán in the Museo del Prado
1635 paintings
Elizabeth